Rogue One: A Star Wars Story (or simply Rogue One) is a 2016 American epic space opera film directed by Gareth Edwards. The screenplay by Chris Weitz and Tony Gilroy is from a story by John Knoll and Gary Whitta. It was produced by Lucasfilm and distributed by Walt Disney Studios Motion Pictures. It is the first installment of the Star Wars anthology series, and an immediate prequel to Star Wars (1977). The main cast consists of Felicity Jones, Diego Luna, Ben Mendelsohn, Donnie Yen, Mads Mikkelsen, Alan Tudyk, Riz Ahmed, Jiang Wen, and Forest Whitaker. Set a week before Star Wars, the plot follows a group of rebels who band together to steal plans of the Death Star, the ultimate weapon of the Galactic Empire. It details the Rebel Alliance's first effective victory against the Empire, first referenced in Star Wars opening crawl.

Based on an idea first pitched by Knoll ten years before it entered development, the film was made to be different in tone and style from the traditional Star Wars films, omitting the customary opening crawl and transitional screen wipes. Principal photography on the film began at Pinewood Studios, Buckinghamshire, in early August 2015 and wrapped in February 2016. With an estimated production budget of at least $220 million, it is one of the most expensive films ever made.

Rogue One premiered in Los Angeles on December 10, 2016, and was theatrically released in the United States on December 16. The film received positive reviews from critics, with praise for its acting, story, visuals, musical score, and dark tone, but criticism for its pacing, characters, and digital recreations of Peter Cushing and Carrie Fisher. It grossed over $1 billion worldwide, making it the 20th-highest-grossing film of all time and the second-highest-grossing film of 2016 during its theatrical run. It received two Academy Award nominations for Best Sound Mixing and Best Visual Effects. 

Andor, a spin-off prequel television series, debuted on Disney+ on September 21, 2022, with Luna, Whitaker, Genevieve O'Reilly, and Duncan Pow returning.

Plot 

Research scientist Galen Erso and his family are hiding on the planet Lah'mu when Imperial weapons developer Orson Krennic arrives to press him into completing the Death Star, a space station-based superweapon capable of destroying planets. Galen's wife Lyra is killed in the confrontation while their daughter Jyn escapes and is rescued by rebel extremist Saw Gerrera.

Thirteen years later, cargo pilot Bodhi Rook defects from the Empire, taking a holographic message recorded by Galen to Gerrera on the desert moon Jedha. Rebel Alliance intelligence officer Cassian Andor learns of Rook's defection and the Death Star from an informant. Jyn is freed from an Imperial labor camp at Wobani and is brought to the Rebel leaders Bail Organa and Mon Mothma, who convince her to find and rescue Galen so the Alliance can learn more about the Death Star. Cassian is covertly ordered to aid Jyn, but kill Galen rather than extract him.

Jyn, Cassian, and reprogrammed Imperial droid K-2SO travel to Jedha, where the Empire is removing kyber crystals from the holy city to power the Death Star; Gerrera and his partisans are engaged in an armed insurgency against them. With the aid of blind spiritual warrior Chirrut Îmwe and his mercenary friend Baze Malbus, Jyn makes contact with Gerrera, who is holding Rook captive. Gerrera shows her the message in which Galen reveals he has secretly built a vulnerability into the Death Star. The schematics detailing this are in an Imperial data bank on the planet Scarif.

On the Death Star, Krennic orders a low-powered test shot which destroys Jedha's capital. Jyn and her group take Rook and flee the moon, but Gerrera remains to die with the city. Grand Moff Tarkin congratulates Krennic before using Rook's defection and security leak as a pretext to take control of the project. Rook leads the group to Galen's Imperial research facility on the planet Eadu, where Cassian chooses not to kill Galen. Moments later, Rebel bombers attack the facility. Galen is wounded and dies in Jyn's arms, before she escapes with her group on a stolen Imperial cargo shuttle. Krennic is summoned by Darth Vader to answer for the Death Star's attack on Jedha. Krennic seeks his support for an audience with the Emperor, but Vader instead Force-chokes him and orders him to ensure no further breaches occur.

Jyn proposes a plan to steal the Death Star schematics using the Rebel fleet but fails to gain approval from the Alliance Council, who feel victory against the Empire is now impossible. Frustrated at their inaction, Jyn's group lead a small squad of Rebel volunteers to raid the databank. Arriving on Scarif on the stolen Imperial ship, which Rook dubs "Rogue One", a disguised Jyn and Cassian enter the base with K-2SO while the other Rebels attack the Imperial garrison as a diversion.

The Alliance learns of the raid from intercepted Imperial communications and deploys their fleet in support. K-2SO sacrifices himself so Jyn and Cassian can retrieve the data. Îmwe is killed after activating the master switch to allow communication with the Rebel fleet, and Malbus is killed shortly afterward. Rook is killed by a grenade after informing the Rebel fleet that it must deactivate the planetary shield to allow the transmission of the schematics. Rebel Admiral Raddus uses a Hammerhead corvette to destroy two Star Destroyers, and the wreckage crashes atop a generator, deactivating the shield. Jyn and Cassian obtain the schematics, but are ambushed by Krennic, who is shot and wounded by Cassian. Jyn transmits the schematics to the Rebel command ship via the base's antenna moments before the Death Star enters orbit above Scarif. Tarkin uses another shot from the Death Star to destroy the antenna, killing Krennic. The impact creates a blast that engulfs the base, killing Cassian, Jyn, and the remaining ground forces.

The Rebel fleet prepares to jump to hyperspace. However, Admiral Raddus and many of the fleet's ships are intercepted by Vader's Star Destroyer. Vader boards the Rebel command ship and kills many troops in an attempt to regain the schematics, but a  starship escapes with them on board. Aboard the fleeing ship, Princess Leia Organa declares that the schematics will provide hope.

Cast

 Felicity Jones as Jyn Erso, a young renegade woman who is detained for her crimes against the Empire until she is freed by the Rebel Alliance to help steal the plans for the Death Star.
 Beau Gadsdon as eight-year-old Jyn
 Dolly Gadsdon as four-year-old Jyn
 Diego Luna as Cassian Andor, a Rebel captain and intelligence officer.
 Ben Mendelsohn as Orson Krennic, the director of advanced weapons research for the Imperial military.
 Donnie Yen as Chirrut Îmwe, a blind warrior who believes in the Force. He is said to be one of the Guardians of the Whills.
 Mads Mikkelsen as Galen Erso, Jyn's father and a research scientist.
 Alan Tudyk as the voice and motion-capture of K-2SO, a former Imperial enforcer droid who was reprogrammed by Cassian Andor to serve the Rebellion.
 Riz Ahmed as Bodhi Rook, a former Imperial cargo pilot who defects to the rebels under the influence of Galen Erso.
 Jiang Wen as Baze Malbus, a longtime companion of Chirrut Îmwe and one-time devoted Guardian of the Whills, now a Rebel warrior and mercenary.
 Forest Whitaker as Saw Gerrera, a veteran of the Clone Wars and a friend of the Erso family who had mentored Jyn in her later childhood years.

Jimmy Smits, Genevieve O'Reilly, Anthony Daniels, and Jimmy Vee reprise their roles from previous films as Bail Organa, Mon Mothma, C-3PO, and R2-D2, respectively; Vee is uncredited for his role. James Earl Jones also reprises his role from previous films as the voice of Darth Vader, who is physically portrayed by Spencer Wilding during the meeting with Krennic and aboard the Star Destroyer, and by Daniel Naprous for the end scene. Grand Moff Tarkin and Princess Leia Organa are played by Guy Henry and Ingvild Deila, respectively, with the digital likenesses of Peter Cushing and Carrie Fisher superimposed. Henry also provides the voice for Tarkin, while archival audio of Fisher is used for Leia. Angus MacInnes and Drewe Henley are featured as Gold Leader Dutch Vander and Red Leader Garven Dreis, respectively, via unused footage from A New Hope; MacInnes returned to record new dialogue for Vander, while new dialogue for the deceased Henley was assembled from archival material. David Ankrum, who voiced Wedge Antilles in A New Hope, reprises his role in a vocal cameo. Ian McElhinney, Michael Smiley, Andy de la Tour, and Tim Beckmann play General Jan Dodonna, Dr. Evazan, General Hurst Romodi, and Captain Raymus Antilles, respectively. Warwick Davis plays Weeteef Cyubee, a member of Saw Gerrera's Partisans. Dave Filoni reprises his role as C1-10P from Star Wars Rebels. Stephen Stanton voices Admiral Raddus, while Paul Kasey appears in costume as the alien character on-screen.

Duncan Pow plays Ruescott Melshi, a sergeant in the Rebel Alliance. Additionally, Alistair Petrie plays General Davits Draven, Ben Daniels plays General Antoc Merrick, and Valene Kane plays Lyra Erso, Jyn's mother. Jonathan Aris, Fares Fares, and Sharon Duncan-Brewster appear as Senators Nower Jebel, Vasp Vaspar, and Tynnra Pamlo, respectively. Simon Farnaby plays a member of Blue Squadron. Jordan Stephens appears as Rebel Alliance member Corporal Tonc. Nick Kellington plays Bistan, the door gunner on a U-wing during the battle on Scarif. Ian Whyte plays Moroff, a member of Saw Gerrera's Partisans. Daniel Mays appears as Tivik. Rian Johnson and Ram Bergman, director and producer of Star Wars: The Last Jedi, respectively, cameo as two Death Star technicians.

Production

Development
Rogue One is the first film in the Star Wars anthology series, a series of standalone spin-off films in the Star Wars franchise. John Knoll, visual effects supervisor for the Star Wars prequel trilogy, pitched the idea as an episode of the unproduced series Star Wars: Underworld 10 years before the film's development in 2003, during the production of Episode III in Sydney, developing a draft titled "Destroyer of Worlds;" after the Disney acquisition he felt as if he had to pitch it again or forever wonder "what might've happened if I had." In May 2014, Disney announced Gareth Edwards would direct the film and Gary Whitta would write the script. That October, cinematographer Greig Fraser revealed that he would work on the film. In January 2015, it was revealed Whitta had completed his work on the script, and would no longer be with the project. Simon Kinberg was considered as a replacement. Later that month, it was announced Chris Weitz had signed to write the script for the film. In March 2015, the title was announced.

Edwards stated the style of the film would be similar to that of a war film, stating, "It's the reality of war. Good guys are bad. Bad guys are good. It's complicated, layered; a very rich scenario in which to set a movie." Assuming Disney would not allow a dark ending, Edwards had the main characters surviving in the original version of the script, but the producers opted for a more tragic ending and never filmed the original version.

In May 2016, reports emerged the film would undergo five weeks of reshoots with Tony Gilroy writing additional scenes, as well as acting as a second-unit director under Edwards. With input from Edwards, Gilroy oversaw the edit and additional photography of the film which tackled several issues, including the ending. In August, Gilroy was given screenplay credit alongside Weitz and was paid $5 million for his work on the film. Additionally, Christopher McQuarrie, Scott Z. Burns, and Michael Arndt all contributed to the script at various stages in development.

In July 2016, discussing whether the film would feature an opening crawl, Kathleen Kennedy said, "we're in the midst of talking about it, but I don't think these [anthology] films will have an opening crawl." Edwards explained that the film was "supposed to be different than the saga films," and that "This film is born out of a crawl. ... There's this feeling that if we did a crawl, then it'll create another movie." In November 2016, Kennedy confirmed the film would not feature an opening crawl, instead beginning in "a way that is traditional, with just the title."

At the 2016 Star Wars Celebration, Edwards said the title had three meanings: "a military sign," referring to the Red Squadron from A New Hope; "the 'rogue' one" of the franchise, given it is the first film to not be part of the main saga; and a description of Jyn Erso's personality.

Casting
In January 2015, The Hollywood Reporter stated numerous actresses, including Tatiana Maslany, Rooney Mara, and Felicity Jones were being tested for the film's lead. In February 2015, it was announced Jones was in final talks to star in the film, while Aaron Paul and Édgar Ramírez were being eyed for the male lead role. In March 2015, Jones was officially cast. In March 2015, Deadline Hollywood reported a rumor that Ben Mendelsohn was being considered for a lead role. The next month, TheWrap reported that Sam Claflin was being eyed for a role, while Riz Ahmed was in negotiations to join the film. In May, Mendelsohn, Ahmed, and Diego Luna were added to the cast of the film, in the lead roles. Forest Whitaker was added to the cast in June 2015. In July 2015, Jonathan Aris was cast to play Senator Jebel. Genevieve O'Reilly was cast as Mon Mothma, reprising her role from Star Wars: Episode III – Revenge of the Sith. James Earl Jones was confirmed to return as the voice of Darth Vader in June 2016.

Filming

Principal photography on the film began at Pinewood Studios, Buckinghamshire, on August 8, 2015. Much of the other photography was completed near Pinewood Studios at Buckinghamshire, UK where huge sets were built to complement scenes filmed elsewhere in the world. The film was shot using Ultra Panavision 70 lenses with Arri Alexa 65 large format digital 6K cameras.

Filming locations were used around the world. In Iceland, the crew shot in Reynisfjara, and around the mountains of Hjörleifshöfði and Hafursey at Mýrdalssandur, which were used to represent Lah'mu and Eadu. Also used were the Krafla area with its volcanic crater and around Lake Mývatn's rock formations. The islands of Gan and Baresdhoo of the Laamu Atoll in the Maldives, as well as the former RAF Bovingdon airfield, were used to represent Scarif. Wadi Rum in Jordan was used to represent Jedha. Pymmes Park in Edmonton, London was also used for location filming, and scenes set on Yavin 4 were filmed at Cardington Airfield. Gareth Edwards selected the London Underground's Canary Wharf station as a location for a chase scene in an Imperial base; the location shoot took place between midnight and 4 am, when the station was closed to the public.

The film spent an estimated total of $265 million and received a $45.5 million subsidy from the United Kingdom's film incentive program.

Post-production
On February 11, 2016, Disney executives stated the film was "virtually completed." Several weeks of pre-scheduled reshoots began in June 2016. Tony Gilroy, who was an uncredited writer on the film at the time, was hired to direct the reshoots and rework aspects of the film, earning him a screenwriting credit. It was created solely using digital tools.

Industrial Light & Magic (ILM) produced the film's visual effects. ILM used CGI and digitally altered archive footage to insert Peter Cushing's likeness over the body of actor Guy Henry. Lucasfilm secured permission from the late actor's estate to include him in the film. The team reportedly searched through countless hours of Cushing footage in order to find suitable reference material, and Henry provided the motion capture and voice work. A digital model of Cushing was mapped over Henry's performance like a digital body mask. Cushing's mannerisms, including his manner of speaking, were studied by the creative team and applied to the digital Tarkin model. Cushing's estate was heavily involved with the creation and had input right down to "small, subtle adjustments." A similar process was used in the portrayal of Princess Leia; Carrie Fisher's appearance as Leia in the first film was superimposed over the face of Norwegian actress Ingvild Deila and archival audio of Fisher saying "hope" was used to voice the character.

Post-production wrapped on November 28, 2016.

Music 

In March 2015, it was reported that Alexandre Desplat who had worked with Edwards on Godzilla (2014), would compose the score for Rogue One, and had confirmed it in an April 2016 interview. As the film's reshooting affected the post-production process, Desplat opted out from the project due to his commitments for scoring Valerian and the City of a Thousand Planets (2017), and was replaced by Michael Giacchino in September 2016. Giacchino only had four and a half weeks to compose the music for the film, beginning almost immediately after finishing production on Doctor Strange. In addition to composing original themes, Giacchino incorporated John Williams' themes from previous films into the score. The official soundtrack was released by Walt Disney Records on December 16, 2016. An extended version of the soundtrack was released on February 11, 2022, which includes additional demos composed for the film score, and cues that were not included in the album, or being un-edited. A vinyl edition was further released by Mondo in March 2022.

Marketing

Promotion
Promotion of Rogue One was initially delayed by the release of the film Mission: Impossible – Rogue Nation in July 2015, because the titles are similar. Paramount Pictures registered and cleared the title with the Motion Picture Association of America in January 2015, well before Disney announced the title of its forthcoming Star Wars spinoff. Disney and Lucasfilm had to reach an agreement with Paramount over promotion in order to avoid any confusion in the public mind. Disney agreed to embargo promotion on Rogue One until after mid-2015, with the exception of a very short teaser which was screened at Star Wars Celebration in Anaheim that year.

A teaser trailer for Rogue One, released by Lucasfilm on April 7, 2016, was praised by reviewers for its portrayal of strong female characters. The Daily Telegraph described Jyn Erso's character as "a roguish, Han Solo-style heroine," calling the film "progressive," while noting its painstaking faithfulness to the production design style of the original Star Wars trilogy. The Hollywood Reporter also noted the visual nods to the original trilogy, and examined the film's possible narrative direction, considering that the outcome is to some extent already revealed in the opening crawl of A New Hope. The Atlantic writer David Sims stated that the trailer brought "back some memorable pieces of architecture, from the lumbering AT-AT walkers to the Death Star itself, not to mention the glorious 70s costuming of Star Wars." He added that the trailer has "the look," blending the old with the new. The trailer was viewed close to 30 million times in its first 29 hours, at a rate of 800,000 views per hour, from Facebook and YouTube, which is 200,000 views shy of what the first teaser trailer for Star Wars: The Force Awakens was receiving in November 2014.

In June 2016, Rogue One was promoted at the Star Wars Celebration Europe III event in London. During the event, a new official poster was unveiled, which depicts a battle taking place on the tropical planet Scarif, with the Death Star looming large in a blue sky, above which is printed the tagline "A Rebellion Built on Hope". A second teaser trailer was screened exclusively at the event, and it was reviewed favorably by critics; The Daily Telegraph noted that the trailer revealed new locations such as the planets Jedha and Scarif, and that its most significant revelation came in the final seconds of the teaser, with the appearance of Darth Vader, reflected in a computer screen and accompanied by his classic breathing sound effect. Variety also hailed the Vader reveal, and noted that the emphasis of the production was much more on the kinetic depiction of large battle sequences and full-on warfare, comparing it to Francis Ford Coppola's 1979 Vietnam War epic Apocalypse Now. A showreel was also shown during the event, which featured footage from the film, cut with behind-the-scenes shots and interviews with the director and cast members. The second trailer was shown publicly during a broadcast of the 2016 Summer Olympics and received positive responses; Wired stated that the trailer was "littered with nostalgic throwbacks to the original trilogy," while Rolling Stone described the CGI landscape shots seen in the footage as "eye-poppingly gorgeous."

A further trailer released in October 2016 prompted The Hollywood Reporter to comment that the newly revealed footage looked like "a trailer to a different movie than the one advertised earlier," remarking that Jyn Erso appeared to be portrayed as a more vulnerable character, and highlighting the appearance of Galen Erso as a protective father figure. Vanity Fair also commented on the emphasis given to Jyn's relationship with her father, suggesting that Rogue One was drawing on "the Star Wars franchise's greatest natural resource: daddy issues."

The film's publicity tour began in Mexico on November 23, 2016.

In Asia, Disney focused marketing efforts on Donnie Yen, with his individual poster being used for marketing in territories including Japan, Singapore, Indonesia, Thailand, Hong Kong, China, Vietnam, and Malaysia. The official Star Wars Facebook page of the respective Asian countries also featured clips and videos of Donnie Yen speaking various languages, greeting fans and telling them to support the film. Disney also released various versions of international trailers with more footage of Yen.

Tie-in novels
A tie-in novel to the film, Catalyst: A Rogue One Novel, was released on November 15, 2016. Written by veteran Star Wars novelist James Luceno, the story is set some years before the events of Rogue One, and provides a backstory to the 2016 film. The novelization of the film was written by Alexander Freed, and released on December 16, 2016.

Months after the film was released, Lucasfilm Press published two further novels, titled Star Wars: Rebel Rising and Star Wars: Guardians of the Whills on May 2, 2017. Rebel Rising was written by Beth Revis, and explains what happened to Jyn Erso between the time her mother died and the day when Rebel agents freed her from an Imperial labor camp, a time period that the film skips over in its opening minutes. Guardians of the Whills was written by novelist and comic writer Greg Rucka, and focuses on the characters Chirrut and Baze, telling their backstories as well as giving more context to the events that happened on Jedha prior to the Imperial occupation depicted in the film.

Comics
Months after the film was released, Marvel Comics adapted the film into a six-part comic book miniseries, which adds extra content.  The miniseries' complete collection was released on December 12, 2017.

In August 2017, IDW Publishing announced that it would make a one-shot graphic novel adaptation of the film, which was released one day after the Marvel miniseries' collection was released.  Unlike the Marvel miniseries, this graphic novel will have slightly more cartoonish visuals.

In the same month, Marvel Comics released the Star Wars: Rogue One – Cassian & K-2SO Special, a 40-page one-shot comic focusing on the first meeting between Cassian Andor and K-2SO. The comic was written by Duane Swierczynski and pencilled by Fernando Blanco.

Video games
A downloadable expansion pack for Star Wars Battlefront (2015), titled Rogue One: Scarif, was released in December 2016, and added content based on the film, including new game modes, a map based on the planet Scarif, and Jyn Erso and Orson Krennic as playable characters. A free virtual reality mission for PlayStation 4 was also released alongside the expansion. A free update for Star Wars Battlefront II (2017) was released in April 2020, adding a different Scarif map and other Rogue One-inspired content. Several characters and concepts from the film were also included in the mobile games Star Wars: Force Arena, Star Wars Commander, and Star Wars: Galaxy of Heroes.

Release

Theatrical

Rogue One premiered at the Pantages Theatre in Los Angeles on December 10, 2016. The film was released in certain European countries on December 14, 2016, in North America on December 16, and in China on January 6, 2017.

Home media
Rogue One was released on Digital HD on March 24, 2017, and by Walt Disney Studios Home Entertainment on Blu-ray, Blu-ray 3D, and DVD on April 4, 2017.

It was released in 4K for the first time through the launch of Disney+ and was made available on Digital Ultra HD at the same time. It was released for Ultra HD Blu-ray on March 31, 2020, whilst also being reissued on Blu-ray and DVD.

2022 IMAX re-release

To promote the release of Andor, Disney re-released Rogue One into over 150 IMAX theaters across the United States and Canada on August 26, 2022, featuring an exclusive preview of the Disney+ series ahead of its three-episode premiere on September 21st, 2022.

Reception

Box office
Rogue One grossed $534.9 million in the United States and Canada, and $523.9 million in other countries, for a worldwide total of $1.057 billion. Deadline Hollywood calculated the film's net profit as $319.6 million, accounting for production budgets, marketing, talent participation, and other costs; box office grosses and home media revenues placed it third on their list of 2016's "Most Valuable Blockbusters."

In late November 2016, box office projections for the United States and Canada had the film grossing $100–150 million during its opening weekend. Disney chairman Bob Iger noted that Disney and Lucasfilm did not expect Rogue One to match The Force Awakens total gross of $2.1 billion, nor its $248 million opening. Pre-sale tickets for the film went on sale at 12:01 AM EST on November 28, 2016. Within 10 minutes, ticket sale sites such as Fandango crashed, much like they had in advance of The Force Awakens the year prior. In its first 24 hours, the film had the second-highest number of pre-sale tickets ever sold, behind only The Force Awakens. Worldwide, the film was expected to gross $280–350 million in its opening weekend.

In the United States, the film made $29 million from its Thursday night previews, making it the highest-grossing Thursday opening of 2016. On Friday, the film grossed $71.1 million, and $46.3 million the next day, securing a total of $155.1 million in its opening weekend, the third-biggest debut of 2016. It topped the box office once again in its second weekend, grossing $64 million (down 58.7%) over the three day weekend, and $96.1 million over the four day weekend. On Christmas Day, it grossed $25.9 million. It finished first at the box office again in its third weekend, grossing $49.6 million (−22.5%) over the three-day weekend and $65.5 million over the four-day weekend. In its fourth weekend, Sunday projections had the film grossing $22 million, besting newcomer Hidden Figures $21.8 million. However, final figures the following day revealed the film tallied a weekend total of $21.9 million, falling to second place behind Hidden Figures $22.8 million. The IMAX re-release of the film on August 26, 2022 made $1.1 million over the weekend, bringing its running IMAX total to $105 million, 10th all-time.

Critical response
The website's critical consensus reads, "Rogue One draws deep on Star Wars mythology while breaking new narrative and aesthetic ground and suggesting a bright blockbuster future for the franchise." On Metacritic, the film has a weighted average score 65 out of 100, based on 51 critics, indicating "generally favorable reviews." Audiences polled by CinemaScore gave the film an average grade of "A" on an A+ to F scale, while PostTrak reported film goers gave the film a 91% overall positive score.

IGN reviewer Eric Goldman gave the film 9/10, saying, "Rogue One is a movie crammed with fan service, but when fan service is done this well, there's little to complain about and much to adore." Peter Travers of Rolling Stone gave the film 3.5 out of 4 stars, writing, "this spin-off/prequel has the same primitive, lived-in, emotional, loopy, let's-put-on-a-show spirit that made us fall in love with the original trilogy." /Film gave Rogue One 8/10, writing that the film is enjoyable but does not have the emotional weight of The Force Awakens, because "no character in Rogue One was strongly compelling." PopMatters wrote, "Rogue One seems to enjoy spending time on a whole new batch of moons and planets we haven't seen before, reveling in the clutter and clamor of far-flung settlements where anti-Imperial sentiments fester. But the film is bogged down in engineering the complex maneuverings of spy games, dogfights, and the most sprawling Rebel-versus-Empire land battle scene since the opening of The Empire Strikes Back." Justin Chang, writing for the Los Angeles Times, called Rogue One "a swiftly paced, rough-and-ready entertainment."

The New York Times wrote, "All the pieces are there, in other words, like Lego figures in a box. The problem is that the filmmakers haven't really bothered to think of anything very interesting to do with them. A couple of 9-year-olds on a screen-free rainy afternoon would come up with better adventures, and probably also better dialogue." Richard Brody of The New Yorker called the film "lobotomized and "depersonalized," and wrote it "isn't so much a movie as a feature-length promotional film for itself; it's a movie that is still waiting to be made." The Washington Post wrote "Rogue One represents an unobjectionable exercise in franchise extension. It's fine. It'll do. For now."

IndieWire's David Ehrlich gave the film a C+ rating, calling it "a spirited but agonizingly safe attempt to expand cinema's most holy blockbuster franchise and keep the wheels greased between proper installments ... just a glorified excuse to retcon some sense into one of the silliest things about the original." While he praised the set design and visuals, calling them "gorgeous," he criticized a lack of interesting character development and a script that felt "completely constricted by its purpose."

Peter Bradshaw, film critic of The Guardian said: "Rogue One doesn't really go rogue at any stage, and it isn't a pop culture event like The Force Awakens, in whose slipstream this appears; part of its charm resides in the eerie, almost dreamlike effect of continually producing familiar elements, reshuffled and reconfigured, a reaching back to the past and hinting at a preordained future. There are some truly spectacular cameos from much-loved personae, involving next-level digital effects—almost creepily exact, so that watching feels at various stages like going into a time machine, back to the 80s and 70s."

George Lucas was reported to have enjoyed the film more than The Force Awakens; upon hearing this, Edwards said, "I can die happy now." 

The film was praised for its exploration of ethics in engineering; in a reviewer's words, "the core ethical arc of the film is one man's decision to engineer the Death Star in such a way as to prevent its use for galactic domination. One could fairly re-title the movie to 'Rogue One: an Engineering Ethics Story.'"

A writer for the military news website Task & Purpose lauded Rogue One as the Star Wars film that best reflects real military experience. Many details, James Seddon writes, resonate with his own 21 years of service in the U.S. Navy:
 
He also pointed to aspects beyond the film's production design, like Rebel Lt. Sefla's muzzle discipline, the "bitter stoicism" predominant among characters who "spend most of their time wet, uncomfortable, afraid, and bickering" even as they work diligently to complete their mission, and the moral ambiguity of some of the Rebel's actions.

Digital recreation
While much of the computer-generated imagery (CGI) received praise, some news organizations published criticism about certain aspects, including the visual effects (VFX) that were used to revive Peter Cushing, who had died in 1994, as Grand Moff Tarkin. The Guardians Catherine Shoard described the "resurrection" as a "digital indignity." Joseph Walsh of The Guardian raised legal and ethical issues about bringing a long-dead actor to life. Lucasfilm had obtained permission from Cushing's estate before deciding to use his likeness. The Washington Times Eric Althoff rejected the entire concept of using CGI to recreate a deceased actor: "Alas, what we get is, basically, not a simulation, but an approximation of a simulation—a dead character portrayed by a living actor inhabiting not the character, but imitating the dead actor."

Some journalists also criticized the quality of the CGI that was used to represent a younger Carrie Fisher in order to portray Princess Leia at an earlier time, as well as its suitability in movie-making. Eliana Dockterman of Time wrote that "there was something particularly plastic about this version of the young Carrie Fisher—so smooth and so perfect it couldn't be real—that pulled me out of the moment." Kelly Lawler of USA Today said: "... while Tarkin is merely unnerving, the Leia cameo is so jarring as to take the audience completely out of the film at its most emotional moment. Leia's appearance was meant to help the film end on a hopeful note (quite literally, as 'hope' is her line), but instead it ends on a weird and unsettling one." Michael Cavna of The Washington Post described the facial effect as feeling "distractingly artificial and nearly alien, like a plastered death mask robbed of authentic actorly effect, well beyond the usual artifice of Botox." For her part, Fisher was shown the CGI rendition of her younger self for the film by Kathleen Kennedy and "loved it."

Accolades
{| class="wikitable plainrowheaders sortable"
|- style="background:#ccc; text-align:center;"
! scope="col"| Award
! scope="col"| Date of ceremony
! scope="col"| Category
! scope="col" style="width:30%;"| Recipients
! scope="col"| Result
! scope="col" class="unsortable"| 
|-
! scope="row" rowspan="2"| Academy Awards
| rowspan="2"| February 26, 2017
| Best Sound Mixing
| David Parker, Christopher Scarabosio and Stuart Wilson
| 
| rowspan="2" style="text-align:center;"|
|-
| Best Visual Effects
| Neil Corbould, Hal Hickel, John Knoll and Mohen Leo
| 
|-
! scope="row" rowspan="2"| British Academy Film Awards
| rowspan=2| February 12, 2017
| Best Makeup and Hair
| Amanda Knight, Neal Scanlan and Lisa Tomblin
| 
| rowspan="2" style="text-align:center;"|
|-
| Best Special Visual Effects
| Neil Corbould, Hal Hickel, John Knoll, Mohen Leo and Nigel Sumner
| 
|-
! scope="row"| Cinema Audio Society Awards
| February 18, 2017
| Outstanding Achievement in Sound Mixing for a Motion Picture – Live Action
| Joel Iwataki, Nick Kray, David Parker, Frank Rinella, Christopher Scarabosio and Stuart Wilson
| 
| style="text-align:center;"|
|-
! scope="row"| Costume Designers Guild Awards
| February 21, 2017
| Excellence in Fantasy Film
| David Crossman and Glyn Dillon
| 
| style="text-align:center;"|
|-
! scope="row"|Dragon Awards
| September 3, 2017
| Best Science Fiction or Fantasy Movie
| rowspan="3" | Rogue One
| 
| style="text-align:center;"|
|-
! scope="row" rowspan="9"| Empire Awards
| rowspan="9"| March 19, 2017
| Best Film
| rowspan="1" 
| rowspan="9" style="text-align:center;"|
|-
| Best Sci-Fi/Fantasy
| rowspan="1" 
|-
| Best Actress
| Felicity Jones
| rowspan="1" 
|-
| Best Male Newcomer
| Riz Ahmed
| rowspan="1" 
|-
| Best Director
| Gareth Edwards
| rowspan="1" 
|-
| Best Costume Design
| rowspan="4"| Rogue One
| rowspan="1" 
|-
| Best Production Design
| rowspan="1" 
|-
| Best Make-Up and Hairstyling
| rowspan="1" 
|-
| Best Visual Effects
| rowspan="1" 
|-
! scope="row"|Hugo Awards
| August 11, 2017
| Best Dramatic Presentation – Long form
| Chris Weitz and Tony Gilroy
| 
| style="text-align:center;"|
|-
! scope="row" rowspan=2|Location Managers Guild Awards
| rowspan=2|April 8, 2017
| Outstanding Locations in Period Film
| Mark Somner and David O'Reily
| rowspan="1" 
| style="text-align:center;" rowspan=2|<ref>{{cite web |last1=Petski |first1=Denise |title=Hidden Figures,' 'La La Land' Among Location Managers Guild Award Nominees |url=https://hollywoodreporter.com/lists/hidden-figures-la-la-land-location-managers-guild-awards-nominees-2017-978431/item/outstanding-locations-a-period-tv-series-location-managers-guild-award-nominees-2017-978434/ |work=The Hollywood Reporter |date=February 22, 2017 |access-date=February 22, 2017 |archive-date=February 23, 2017 |archive-url=https://web.archive.org/web/20170223043016/http://www.hollywoodreporter.com/lists/hidden-figures-la-la-land-location-managers-guild-awards-nominees-2017-978431/item/outstanding-locations-a-period-tv-series-location-managers-guild-award-nominees-2017-978434 |url-status=live }}</ref>
|-
| Outstanding Film Commission
| "Jedha" – Royal Film Commission Jordan
| rowspan="1" 
|-
! scope="row" rowspan=2|MTV Movie & TV Awards
| rowspan=2|May 17, 2017
| Movie of the Year
| Rogue One| rowspan="1" 
| style="text-align:center;" rowspan=2|
|-
| Best Hero
| Felicity Jones
| rowspan="1" 
|-
! scope="row"|Ray Bradbury Award
| May 20, 2017
| Outstanding Dramatic Presentation
| Chris Weitz, Tony Gilroy and Gareth Edwards
| 
| style="text-align:center;"|
|-
! scope="row" rowspan="11"| Saturn Awards
| rowspan="11"| June 28, 2017
| Best Science Fiction Film
| Rogue One| 
| rowspan="11" style="text-align:center;"|
|-
| Best Director
| Gareth Edwards
| 
|-
| Best Writing
| Chris Weitz and Tony Gilroy
| 
|-
| Best Actress
| Felicity Jones
| 
|-
| Best Supporting Actor
| Diego Luna
| 
|-
| Best Music
| Michael Giacchino
| 
|-
| Best Editing
| John Gilroy, Colin Goudie and Jabez Olssen
| 
|-
| Best Production Design
| Doug Chiang and Neil Lamont
| 
|-
| Best Costume Design
| David Crossman and Glyn Dillon
| 
|-
| Best Make-up
| Amy Byrne
| 
|-
| Best Special Effects
| Neil Corbould, Hal Hickel, John Knoll and Mohen Leo
| 
|-
! scope="row" rowspan=3|Teen Choice Awards
| rowspan=3|August 13, 2017
| Choice Sci-Fi Movie
| Rogue One| 
| rowspan=3 style="text-align:center;" |
|-
| Choice Sci-Fi Movie Actor
| Diego Luna
| 
|-
| Choice Sci-Fi Movie Actress
| Felicity Jones
| 
|-
! scope="row" rowspan="7"| Visual Effects Society Awards
| rowspan="7"| February 7, 2017
| Outstanding Visual Effects in a Photoreal Feature
| Neil Corbould, Erin Dusseault, Hal Hickel, John Knoll and Nigel Sumner
| 
| rowspan="7" style="text-align:center;" |
|-
| Outstanding Animated Performance in a Photoreal Feature
| "Grand Moff Tarkin" – Cyrus Jam, Sven Jensen, Jee Young Park and Steve Walton
| 
|-
| Outstanding Created Environment in a Photoreal Feature
| "Scarif Complex" – Enrico Damm, Yanick Dusseault, Kevin George and Olivier Vernay-Kim
| 
|-
| Outstanding Virtual Cinematography in a Photoreal Project
| "Space Battle" – Steve Ellis, Barry Howell, Euising Lee and John Levin
| 
|-
| rowspan="2"| Outstanding Model in a Photoreal or Animated Project
| "Princess Leia" – Paul Giacoppo, Gareth Jensen, James Tooley and Todd Vaziri
| 
|-
| "Star Destroyer" – Marko Chulev, Steven Knipping, Jay Machado and Akira Orikasa
| 
|-
| Outstanding Effects Simulations in a Photoreal Feature
| "Jedha Destruction" – Luca Mignardi, Ciaran Moloney, Matt Puchala and Miguel Perez Senent
| 
|}

Prequel television series

On November 8, 2018, it was announced that a live-action prequel series was officially in development and set to air on Disney's streaming service, Disney+. The series takes place five years before the events in Rogue One'' and focuses on Cassian Andor with Diego Luna reprising the role. It was released on September 21, 2022.

Notes

References

External links 

 
  at Starwars.com
  at 
 
 

2016 films
2016 3D films
2010s adventure films
2016 science fiction action films
American 3D films
American action adventure films
American science fantasy films
American science fiction action films
American science fiction adventure films
American science fiction war films
2010s science fiction war films
American space adventure films
American sequel films
2010s English-language films
Films about terrorism
Films directed by Gareth Edwards
Films produced by Kathleen Kennedy
Films scored by Michael Giacchino
Films shot in Hertfordshire
Films shot in Iceland
Films shot in Jordan
Films shot in London
Films shot in the Maldives
Films shot at Pinewood Studios
Films with screenplays by Tony Gilroy
Films with screenplays by Chris Weitz
IMAX films
Interquel films
Lucasfilm films
Films using motion capture
Star Wars spin-off films
Films about deserters
Films shot in Bedfordshire
4DX films
2010s American films